The 2015 NP300 Navara Winton Super Sprint was a motor race for V8 Supercars held on the weekend of 15–17 May 2015. It was the fourth round of fourteen in the 2015 International V8 Supercars Championship.

After scoring his first two pole positions of his career, Prodrive Racing Australia's Chaz Mostert added another two poles for both Saturday races. He was to start alongside Michael Caruso for Race 10 – his and Nissan's first front row start for the year. Mostert stayed at the front of the field to take his first race win of the year, ahead of teammate Mark Winterbottom. Caruso held on to finish on the podium.

Race 11 saw Winterbottom take the lead early from Mostert at the first corner, while in the mid pack, it was not so great for the Holden Racing Team drivers. James Courtney drove in deep at turn 1 taking out his teammate Garth Tander, with Lee Holdsworth and James Moffat also forced off the road. Andre Heimgartner was also unlucky after being spun around by Dale Wood on the old pit straight. Winterbottom and Mostert stayed out of trouble to finish first and third respectively. Rick Kelly finished in second place – his first podium finish since 2011.

Again the Ford FG X Falcons were fast in qualifying and Mostert took a clean sweep of pole positions for the weekend, with Winterbottom on the front row. It was smooth sailing for Mostert until after first pit stops were completed, where he lost the rear of the car by driving wide on entry to turn 4 and backing into the tyre barrier on exit. Craig Lowndes was in a position to take his 100th career victory, but Winterbottom was too quick – taking his fourth victory of the year. Fabian Coulthard again scoring well in the  races by taking second place, with Lowndes coming home in third position.

Results

Race 10

Race 11

Race 12

Championship standings
 After Race 12 of 36

Drivers' Championship standings

Teams' Championship standings

 Note: Only the top five positions are included for both sets of standings.

References

Winton
May 2015 sports events in Australia